Mr. Harold Hooper (played by Will Lee) was one of the first four human characters to appear on the television series Sesame Street. Created by producer and writer Jon Stone, Mr. Hooper is the original proprietor of Hooper's Store, the neighborhood variety store and combination diner/corner store that serves as a place for Muppets and humans to meet and interact. Lee, a character actor and instructor was "perfectly cast" as Mr. Hooper. Mr. Hooper ranked first of all human characters of the show in recognition by young viewers. Mr. Hooper, who has been described as "slightly cranky but good-hearted" and "curmudgeonly", bridges the gap between the older generation and its young audience. Hooper's Store, "an idealized social institution", is an extension of his personality. He had a close relationship with the Muppet Big Bird. 

After Lee's death on December 7, 1982, instead of recasting the role, or explaining his departure by saying he had moved, quit or retired, the writers and producers of Sesame Street decided to have the character of Mr. Hooper die. Then, they used the episode to teach their young audience about the difficult topic of death. Research was conducted to ascertain the messages they wanted to convey about the topic, as well as the effect the episode would have on the young children who watched it. They were advised by experts in the fields of child psychology, child development, and religion. Studies conducted after the episode was produced showed that most children understood its messages about death, and that they experienced no long-term ill effects.

The episode, written by head writer Norman Stiles, aired on Thanksgiving Day 1983. The cast and crew reported that filming it was an emotional and touching experience, with Bob McGrath listing it as one of his two favorites. Setting the standard for dealing with difficult topics on children's television, the show was called heartbreaking yet affirming, and remains one of the proudest moments in the show's history.

Development and description
Mr. Hooper, played by Will Lee from the premiere of Sesame Street in 1969 until his death in 1982, was one of the first four human characters that appeared on the show. Created by producer and writer Jon Stone, the role of Mr. Hooper was the first to be cast. Lee came to Stone's attention through writers Bruce Hart and Carole Hart. Mr. Hooper was inspired by the Bob Keeshan character Captain Kangaroo; Stone previously worked on the Captain Kangaroo program, which greatly influenced him as he developed Sesame Street. Mr. Hooper is the original proprietor of Hooper's Store, the neighborhood variety store and combination diner/corner store that serves as a place for Muppets and humans to meet and interact. Stone's original conception of Mr. Hooper was that he would be, like most owners of such establishments at the time, older, male, and Jewish.

Lee was a character actor and acting instructor with a range of roles in the theater. Lee had been blacklisted from many mainstream acting roles for about five years during the McCarthy era, for refusing to cooperate with the House Un-American Activities Committee's investigation of Communist influence in show business. According to writer Michael Davis, Lee played Mr. Hooper, known for his bowtie and hornrimmed glasses, "with such certainty and naturalness he made adults suspend their sense of disbelief". Writer Louise A. Gikow stated that Lee was "perfectly cast" as Mr. Hooper. According to fellow cast member Bob McGrath, who also appeared in Sesame Street's first episode with Lee, "Will had a broader dimension to his character than perhaps the rest of us did ... He convinced me that no matter how simple the scene was with a child, you had to bring a tremendous integrity and an honesty and credibility to it". Joan Ganz Cooney, Sesame Street co-creator and president of the Children's Television Workshop (CTW), said, "He gave millions of children the message that the old and the young have a lot to say to each other". The New York Times reported that Mr. Hooper ranked first of all human characters of the show in recognition by young viewers.

Davis described Mr. Hooper as "slightly cranky but good-hearted". Gikow called Mr. Hooper "curmudgeonly". Davis stated that since Mr. Hooper's appearance in the first episode of Sesame Street, he had become many things to many young children, "... the guy in the apron at the far side of the generation gap, his half-lens glasses slipping down his nose". Davis also stated that Hooper's Store, which he called "an idealized social institution", is an extension of Mr. Hooper's personality. Mr. Hooper has a special relationship with the Muppet character Big Bird, who would often come into Hooper's Store for a birdseed milkshake and a chat. A running gag in the show was that Big Bird would often mispronounce Mr. Hooper's name, although most attempts ended in "ooper", such as "Looper" or "Cooper". Mr. Hooper's first name, Harold, was not revealed until the character earned a GED during night school.

Mr. Hooper's last appearances on Sesame Street aired in 1983, but Lee's last segments for the show were taped in November 1982. Lee participated in the Macy's Thanksgiving Day Parade with other Sesame Street characters a few days before he died of a heart attack on December 7, 1982.

Death of Mr. Hooper
When Will Lee died on December 7, 1982, instead of recasting the role for the character (replacing Will Lee with a new actor so Mr. Hooper could still be in the show), explaining Mr. Hooper's departure (by saying that he had retired and/or moved away), or simply dropping him from the show without explanation, the producers of Sesame Street decided to have the character pass away and use the episode to teach their young audience about the difficult topic of death. According to CTW researcher Rosemarie Truglio and her colleagues, the episode was one of the many social issues relevant to preschoolers the show has dealt with throughout its history. Executive producer Dulcy Singer reported that they followed their instincts to be "honest and straightforward" and to "deal with it head-on".

Synopsis
The Sesame Street episode (#1839) in which the death of Mr. Hooper was discussed, was structured as all episodes were structured at the time, with individual segments that took place on the main brownstone set interrupted by inserts, or puppet skits, short films, and animations. The episode begins with a scene between Gordon (Roscoe Orman) and the Muppet Forgetful Jones (Richard Hunt). Gordon helps Forgetful remember something that had made him happy; as Davis states, "Later, Big Bird forgets something that makes him sad". After several inserts, Big Bird walks backward with his head between his legs; when Gordon asks him why, he answers, "Just because". Later, Big Bird listens to the adults talking about a new baby who is due to visit Sesame Street with his mother.

Two segments later, Big Bird interrupts the adults—Maria (Sonia Manzano), David (Northern Calloway), Bob (Bob McGrath), Susan (Loretta Long), Gordon, Luis (Emilio Delgado), and Olivia (Alaina Reed Hall)—discussing politics by giving them pictures he had drawn of each of them. He gets to Mr. Hooper's picture, saying that he will give it to him when he returns. The human characters explain the irreversibility of death to Big Bird, who reacts by getting upset, expressing his confusion and sadness. The adults reassure him that they love him and will take care of him. David reveals that he will take over the store, Mr. Hooper having left it to him in his will, and that he is going to serve milkshakes to Big Bird, like Mr. Hooper used to do. Big Bird asks, "Why does it have to be this way? Give me one good reason!" and after a long silence Gordon answers, "Big Bird, it has to be this way... because." Looking at Mr. Hooper's picture, Big Bird says, mispronouncing his name as he had done many times in the past, "I'm going to miss you, Mr. Looper." Maria tearfully corrects Big Bird and everyone gathers around him, hugging him in support.

The episode ends with Big Bird hanging Mr. Hooper's picture near his nest. Luis knocks on his door to introduce the new baby, followed by the entire grown-up cast. Big Bird says, "You know what the nice thing is about new babies? One day they're not here, and the next day, here they are!" The cast collectively show affection to the baby as the show closes.

Research
Similar to what they had done with other social issues and in developing their curriculum, the CTW researched the topic of death and how preschoolers understand it. The first step in their research process was to assemble a team of experts, led by CTW research director Lewis Bernstein, in the fields of child psychology, child development, and religion. The team advised the show's writers and producers how to handle the topic, in what they called "a curriculum bath"; Bernstein described it in this way: "We bring in the experts to allow the writer to soak in expertise. We in Research bring in people to provide the information, and then the artistry of the writer takes over, as they integrate what they've heard". The experts advised the producers to provide their viewers with a sense of closure about Mr. Hooper's death. They decided not to focus on how Mr. Hooper died, since explaining that he was old and ill might increase children's fears about death. They chose to deal with his death in a single episode, and convey simple messages like: "Mr. Hooper is dead; Mr. Hooper will not be coming back; and Mr. Hooper will be missed by all". Gikow stated that the episode they created was an example of the writers and producers' skills as educators as well as entertainers.

Before the episode aired, the CTW conducted a series of studies to guide the writers and producers in creating the episode. Their goal was to answer four key questions: (1) Will children understand the messages they wanted to convey about death? (2) How attentive will they be to the storyline? (3) How will parents respond to the treatment of such a sensitive topic? and (4) Will children be disturbed by the messages, and if so, for how long? The researchers broke up children into three groups: children who only watched the scenes in which the storyline was played out and who were interviewed afterwards; children who watched the entire episode and whose attention was recorded while they viewed it; and children who watched the episode without the inserts, with their parents, who were interviewed 9 or 10 days later.

The researchers found that 73% of 4- and 5-year-olds in their study understood that Mr. Hooper was dead and that 88% of this group understood that he was not coming back, although only about one-fourth of the 3-year-old viewers responded correctly. Most of the 4- and 5-year-olds understood that Big Bird and the adults were sad. Most children (80%) were attentive during the episode. The parents interviewed had "overwhelmingly positive" reactions to the show, and that half reported that they had discussed death with their children after viewing it. None of the parents reported negative reactions from their children, either immediately after watching the episode or at a later time.

Development and legacy

Sesame Street head writer Norman Stiles was chosen to write the segments about Mr. Hooper's death. The episode focused on the life cycle of birth and death by also mentioning the birth of a baby, and by remembering Mr. Hooper. Stiles said, "We decided to say that while Mr. Hooper was not here anymore, we will always have that part of him that lives within the heart, that we have our love and that it will always stay". Stiles wanted to convey that expressing grief for someone who had died was difficult for both adults and children. Instead of providing an explanation, the adults of Sesame Street tell Big Bird, when he asked why Mr. Hooper had died, that there was no real reason, that it happened, as Gordon tells Big Bird, "Just because". The show's outside experts advised Stiles and the producers to remove the line because they were concerned that an open-ended explanation would not be enough for children, but Stiles kept the line because it was an acknowledgement, as Gikow stated, that there is never a good explanation about why people die.

The episode aired on Thanksgiving Day 1983, a year after Lee's final appearance as Mr. Hooper at the Macy's Thanksgiving Day parade. The producers chose to air it the first week of the new season in order to explain Mr. Hooper's absence as soon as possible, for maximum exposure, and to ensure that parents were at home with their children in order to discuss it. The illustrations used for the episode were drawn by Caroll Spinney, who performed Big Bird. Mr. Hooper's picture remained on the set from then on, as a continuing memorial to Lee and Mr. Hooper. Spinney, speaking of the scene in which the pictures were passed out, reported, "When we finished that scene there wasn't one of us whose face wasn't streaked with tears", even Spinney underneath his costume. Jon Stone, who directed the episode, wanted to do another take, although Spinney later said, "There was nothing wrong with that take. It was perfect." Cameraman Frankie Biondo was touched by the performance.

A book, entitled I'll Miss You, Mr. Hooper and based upon the script for the episode, was published in 1984. The book was also written by Stiles. According to Renée Cherow-O'Leary, Stiles and the editorial staff of the CTW's book division worked with the show's research staff and used the same educational content information and research the show's producers used to create the episode.

See also
 History of Sesame Street
 Educational goals of Sesame Street
 Sesame Street research
 Format of Sesame Street

References

Citations

Works cited
 Davis, Michael (2008). Street Gang: The Complete History of Sesame Street. New York: Viking Press. 
 Gikow, Louise A. (2009). Sesame Street: A Celebration— Forty Years of Life on the Street. New York: Black Dog & Leventhal Publishers. .
 

Fictional shopkeepers
Sesame Street human characters
Fictional American Jews
Television characters introduced in 1969